The Democratic Agrarian Party was a clandestine political party in the Moldovan SSR.

Activity 

The leader of the Democratic Agrarian Party was Vasile Odobescu. During the Soviet deportations from Bessarabia and Northern Bukovina, his family was deported from Bessarabia.

In 1953, Vasile Odobescu was sentenced to death  and Ilarion Tautu and Alexandru Duca were sentenced to 25 years in prison.

See also 
 List of political parties in Moldova

References

External links
Raportul Comisiei Cojocaru 
Drama Basarabiei 
Preluarea  puterii şi instaurarea dictaturii comuniste 
Raportul privind crimele comunismului in Basarabia

1950 establishments in the Soviet Union
1953 disestablishments in the Soviet Union
Defunct agrarian political parties
Anti-communism in Moldova
Anti-communist parties
Clandestine groups
Defunct political parties in Moldova
Political parties disestablished in 1953
Political parties established in 1950
Pro-independence parties in the Soviet Union